Highland Township is one of the twenty-five townships of Muskingum County, Ohio, United States.  The 2000 census found 848 people in the township.

Geography
Located on the eastern edge of the county, it borders the following townships:
 Monroe Township - north
 Knox Township, Guernsey County - northeast corner
 Adams Township, Guernsey County - east
 Westland Township, Guernsey County - southeast corner
 Union Township - south
 Perry Township - southwest corner
 Salem Township - west
 Adams Township - northwest corner

No municipalities are located in Highland Township.

Name and history
Highland Township was so named for the lofty elevation of the land within its borders. Statewide, the only other Highland Township is located in Defiance County.

By the 1830s, Highland Township had two saw mills, two gristmills, and two churches.

Government
The township is governed by a three-member board of trustees, who are elected in November of odd-numbered years to a four-year term beginning on the following January 1. Two are elected in the year after the presidential election and one is elected in the year before it. There is also an elected township fiscal officer, who serves a four-year term beginning on April 1 of the year after the election, which is held in November of the year before the presidential election. Vacancies in the fiscal officership or on the board of trustees are filled by the remaining trustees.

References

External links
 County website

Townships in Muskingum County, Ohio
Townships in Ohio